The Solo free routine competition of the 2020 European Aquatics Championships was held on 10 and 12 May 2021.

Results
The preliminary round was held on 10 May at 09:00. The final was started on 12 May at 09:00.

Green denotes finalists

References

Solo free routine